is a passenger railway station  located in the city of  Nishinomiya Hyōgo Prefecture, Japan. It is operated by the private transportation company Hankyu Railway. The station name, meaning "Osaka–Kobe National Highway Station", is after Japan National Route 2 which passes near the station.

Lines

Layout
The station consists of two opposed elevated side platforms, with the station building underneath.

Platforms

Adjacent stations

History
Hanshin-Kokudō Station opened on May 10, 1927, the year after the opening of the line between Nishinomiya-Kitaguchi and Imazu.

Passenger statistics
In fiscal 2019, the station was used by an average of 2,438 passengers daily

Surrounding area
Japan National Route 2
Nishinomiya Municipal Fukatsu Junior High School
 Nishinomiya Municipal Fukatsu Elementary School

See also
List of railway stations in Japan

References

External links

 Hanshin-Kokudō Station (Hankyu Railway) 

Railway stations in Hyōgo Prefecture
Hankyu Railway Imazu Line
Stations of Hankyu Railway
Railway stations in Japan opened in 1927
Nishinomiya